Belgium competed at the 2004 Summer Olympics in Athens, Greece. 50 competitors, 31 men and 19 women, took part in 41 events in 14 sports.

Medalists

Athletics 

Belgian athletes have so far achieved qualifying standards in the following athletics events (up to a maximum of 3 athletes in each event at the 'A' Standard, and 1 at the 'B' Standard).

Men
Track & road events

Women
Track & road events

Field events

Canoeing

Sprint

Qualification Legend: Q = Qualify to final; q = Qualify to semifinal

Cycling

Road
Men

Women

Track
Omnium

Mountain biking

Equestrian

Eventing

"#" indicates that the score of this rider does not count in the team competition, since only the best three results of a team are counted.

Show jumping

Fencing

Men

Gymnastics

Artistic
Women

Judo

Women

Rowing

Men

Qualification Legend: FA=Final A (medal); FB=Final B (non-medal); FC=Final C (non-medal); FD=Final D (non-medal); FE=Final E (non-medal); FF=Final F (non-medal); SA/B=Semifinals A/B; SC/D=Semifinals C/D; SE/F=Semifinals E/F; R=Repechage

Sailing

Men

Women

Open

M = Medal race; OCS = On course side of the starting line; DSQ = Disqualified; DNF = Did not finish; DNS= Did not start; RDG = Redress given

Shooting 

Women

Table tennis

Taekwondo

Tennis

Triathlon

The same two women competed for Belgium that did four years earlier.  Both did better in 2004 than they had in the first competition, with Kathleen Smet missing a medal by only 27 seconds.

See also
 Belgium at the 2004 Summer Paralympics

References

External links
 Official website – Belgian Olympic Team 

Nations at the 2004 Summer Olympics
2004
Olympics